Geraldo Del Rey (29 October 1930 – 25 April 1993) was a Brazilian actor. He appeared in 65 films and television shows between 1950 and 1992.

Filmography

External links

1930 births
1993 deaths
Brazilian male film actors
People from Ilhéus
20th-century Brazilian male actors